The Anchorman Mixtape is a mixtape by Canadian rapper k-os which was released on August 9, 2010.  Following the release of his album Yes! earlier in 2009, The mixtape features collaborations with Drake, Saukrates and Sebastien Grainger, among others.

Background
Made available to download from his tour website, the mixtape was mostly recorded on k-os' tour bus while he was touring with Drake in April 2010. It incorporates snippets of the movie Anchorman: The Legend of Ron Burgundy. Providing Will Ferrell's voice as a narrator to the mixtape, each snippet relates to the track following it.

Track listing
"Start Me UP" – 3:01
"SheClipse" – 3:17
"Faith" (featuring Drake) – 3:26
"Joni Mitchellin' Peelin Out" (featuring Saukrates) - 3:00
"Dance In YO Car" - 3:55
"BlackWater" (featuring Sebastien Grainger) - 3:15
"Holy Cow" - 3:54
"I Wish I Could Believe" - 2:52
"Beauty is a Loaded Gun" - 2:55
"The Lonely Ones" - 3:18

'''Sample credits:
 "Start Me UP" samples "Start Me Up" by The Rolling Stones
 "I Wish I Could Believe" samples "Mouthful of Diamonds" by Phantogram
 "Beauty is a Loaded Gun" samples "Chanson D'un Jour D'Hiver" by Cortex

References

K-os albums
2010 mixtape albums
Albums free for download by copyright owner